Taschner or Täschner is a German surname. Notable people with the surname include:

 Gerhard Taschner (1922–1976), Czech-German violinist
 Herbert Täschner (1916–1984), German politician
 Ignatius Taschner (1871–1913), German sculptor and graphic designer
 Jack Taschner (born 1978), American baseball relief pitcher
 John C. Taschner (born c. 1930), American radiation biophysicist

German-language surnames